George William Roberts (born June 10, 1955) is a former American football punter who played five seasons in the National Football League with the Miami Dolphins, San Diego Chargers and Atlanta Falcons. He played college football at Virginia Tech and attended E. C. Glass High School in Lynchburg, Virginia.

References

External links
Just Sports Stats
College stats

Living people
1955 births
Players of American football from Virginia
American football punters
Virginia Tech Hokies football players
Miami Dolphins players
San Diego Chargers players
Atlanta Falcons players
Sportspeople from Lynchburg, Virginia